Oheka Castle, also known as the Otto Kahn Estate, is a hotel located on the North Shore of Long Island, in West Hills, New York, also known as the "Gold Coast," a hamlet in the town of Huntington. It was the country home of investment financier and philanthropist Otto Hermann Kahn and his family. The name "Oheka" is an acronym using the first several letters of each part of its creator's name, Otto Hermann Kahn, which Kahn also used to name his yacht Oheka II and his ocean-front Villa Oheka in Palm Beach, Florida.

The castle is now a hotel with 32 guest rooms and suites. It is a popular wedding venue for socialites, celebrities, and dignitaries, as well as the backdrop to many photo shoots, television series and films. It also offers a bar, restaurant, and mansion tours of the estate and gardens.

In 2004, Oheka was listed on the National Register of Historic Places. It is a member of Historic Hotels of America, the official program of the National Trust for Historic Preservation.

History

Early history
Kahn built Oheka in response to Jews being forbidden entry to clubs and golf courses in Morristown, New Jersey and because in 1905, a previous country home of Kahn's, Cedar Court, was virtually destroyed by fire. He was determined to build a fireproof building, so he had his architects, Delano and Aldrich, design it in steel and concrete, making it one of the first totally fireproof residential buildings. Two years were spent building an artificial hill on which to place the home, giving it views of Cold Spring Hills and Cold Spring Harbor.

Kahn commissioned the Olmsted Brothers to design the estate's grounds, centered on a formal axial sunken garden in the French manner, of clipped greens and gravel in parterres and water terraces, screened by high clipped hedging from the entrance drive that runs parallel to the main axis. Other features of the  complex included an 18-hole golf course designed by golf architect Seth Raynor, one of the largest private greenhouse complexes in America, tennis courts, an indoor swimming pool, a landing strip, orchards, and stables.

Several years after Kahn's death in 1934, the estate was sold. After the sale, it was used for several purposes, including as a retreat for New York City sanitation workers. The school occupied the house until it closed in 1979. For the next four years, the building remained empty, during which time over 100 documented arson attempts occurred, all of which the building survived, demonstrating Kahn's success in building a fireproof building. In 1946 the golf course and stables became part of the Cold Spring Country Club, and the greenhouse complex operated as Otto Keil Florist. Much of the remainder of the property was developed into single-family homes.

Restoration
In 1984, Oheka was purchased by Gary Melius, a Long Island developer. Melius undertook the largest private residential renovation project in the United States to restore the house, which was in a state of almost total disrepair, and recreate the gardens from the original Olmsted plans. In 1988, unable to continue financing the massive project, Melius sold the property to Hideki Yokoi for $22.5 million. Ten years later, following a lawsuit, the building passed to one of Yokoi's daughters and her husband. They were unable to sustain the property themselves, so Melius reacquired it under a long-term lease and later re-purchased the estate, operating it as a weddings and events venue, luxury hotel and conference center.

Trivia

Celebrities who have been married there include Curtis Martin, Kevin Jonas, Megyn Kelly, Joey Fatone, Brian McKnight, former U.S. congressman Anthony Weiner, and comedian Yannis Pappas.

On February 24, 2014, Melius survived a gunshot to the head by a masked gunman in the parking lot of the castle.

In popular culture
 Oheka served as partial inspiration for Gatsby's estate in F. Scott Fitzgerald's The Great Gatsby.
 In Dream World, his collection of songs, poems and stories, composer and musicologist Roger Lee Hall wrote about his years attending Eastern Military Academy at Oheka Castle in the 1950s.
 In the 1941 film Citizen Kane, photographs of Oheka were used to portray the fictional Xanadu. 
 The castle is shown in the 2008 movie What Happens in Vegas, with stars Cameron Diaz and Ashton Kutcher.
 It served as the mansion "Shadow Pond" in the television show Royal Pains, which ran from 2009 to 2016.
 R&B singer Brandy's 1995 music video "Brokenhearted", directed by Hype Williams and featuring Wanya Morris, was filmed inside the castle. 
 The science fiction novel Time for Patriots has a very thinly disguised military academy in a similarly disguised version of Oheka.
 Oheka was the set of the fictional Avalon Castle in the 2010 soap opera As the World Turns.
 It was also shown in the 2010 film It's Kind of a Funny Story.
 It was the location of a charity event in the television show Louie, where Jerry Seinfeld and Louis C.K. performed for the event.
 In 2013, the music video for Beyoncé's "Haunted", was filmed featuring the Oheka mansion.
 The castle was the primary filming location of the music video for Taylor Swift's 2014 song "Blank Space".
 The castle was also used in the music video "Cookie" by recording artist R. Kelly.
 The castle was shown in the 2018 movie The Week Of.
 The castle appeared briefly as the location of an economic summit in the 19th episode of the first season of American political drama Madam Secretary, titled "Spartan Figures".
 The castle was featured on Travel Channel's "Mega Mansions" that also streams on Netflix. The premise of the show was to give viewers an "all-access pass inside America's most enormous, opulent and advanced Mega Mansions."
 The castle and grounds were featured in Liam Payne and Rita Ora's "For You" written for the Fifty Shades Freed movie soundtrack.
 Oheka serves as a stand-in for a French mansion in Season 3 of the Hulu TV series The Path.
 Oheka was used as the setting for a castle in Hungary in season two, episode three, "Hunting", of the HBO series Succession.
 Oheka was used as the setting for the "Mr. Julius Caesar" rematch in the film The Emperor's Club.
 The castle was featured in Season 2 Episode 4 of the Hulu show Ramy, as the residence of the Emirati Bin Khalied.
The castle was used as the setting for the Real Housewives of New York City Season 12 reunion, the first in-person Real Housewives reunion filmed amid the COVID-19 pandemic in the United States.
The castle was featured in the music video for Jennifer Lopez and Maluma's 2020 song "Pa' Ti + Lonely".
 The castle was featured in a MrBeast video in which the MrBeast crew was tasked to stay in a $1 hotel to a $1,000,000 hotel (the million dollar hotel is Oheka castle).

See also
 List of Historic Hotels of America

Further reading
Crazy Rhythm: Memories of Eastern Military Academy and Oheka Castle. Hall, Roger L. PineTree Press, 2019
Raising a Fallen Treasure: The Otto H. Kahn Home, Huntington, Long Island. King, Robert B. The Mad Printers of Mattituck, 1985
Oheka Castle, Sergol, Joan. Schaffer, Ellen. Arcadia Publishing (SC); 4 Jun. 2012, 
The KAHNS of Fifth Avenue, Williams, Iain Cameron. iwp publishing, 17. Feb. 2022,

References
Notes

External links

  www.oheka.com
 Memories of OHEKA CASTLE on the "American Music Preservation.com" website
 Gold Coast Mansions – Historic Long Island – Home on "Gold Coast Mansions of Long Island" website

Castles in New York (state)
Mansions of Gold Coast, Long Island
Gardens in New York (state)
Houses in Suffolk County, New York
Historic house museums in New York (state)
Hotels in New York (state)
Houses completed in 1919
Houses on the National Register of Historic Places in New York (state)
National Register of Historic Places in Huntington (town), New York
Landscape design history of the United States
Delano & Aldrich buildings
Châteauesque architecture in the United States
Historic Hotels of America
Gilded Age mansions